The Boston Almanac was an almanac and business directory in 19th century Boston, Massachusetts. Its offices were destroyed in the Great Boston Fire of 1872.   The first almanac was published in 1836, and continued annually until at least 1894.  Just about all editions contained a chronology of major events in Boston for the previous year or two years.  Each almanac contained business listings, advertisements, and often city and/or state department information.  Railroad, omnibus, and horse car companies were usually listed in a separate section.  Some volumes highlighted famous buildings or places (such as Mount Auburn Cemetery).

Further reading

1800-1849
 1836
 1837
 1838
 1840
 1841
 
 
 1847
 1848
 1849

1850-1899
 
 1851
 1852
 1853
 1854
 1855
 1856
 1857
 1858
 1859
 1860
 1861
 1862
 1863
 1864
 1865
 1866
 1867
 1868
 1869
 1870
 1871
 
 1875
 1876

See also
 Boston Directory

References

External links
 Hathi Trust. Boston Almanac 1836-1870; 1842-1904

Mass media in Boston
19th century in Boston